Modeselektor is a German electronic music duo consisting of Gernot Bronsert and Sebastian Szary.

History 
The group members met in 1992 in Berlin with group member Szary performing live acid house music at illegal underground parties, under the moniker Fundamental Knowledge. The group says, "After the Wall came down, everywhere in Germany and especially East Germany there was a lot of chaos, anarchy." Both soon joined forces and began creating music as Modeselektor, a name taken from a function on the Roland Space Echo analog delay effects unit.

In 1999 Modeselektor signed its first remix contract and began working with Pfadfinderei, a Berlin-based VJ and design collective. In 2000 Modeselektor met Ellen Allien, making BPitch Control their home label. Modeselektor has also been involved in collaborative efforts; Moderat - a musical collaboration between Modeselektor and Apparat, Pfadselektor - a music/visual collaboration between Modeselektor and Pfadfinderei, and with Rhythm & Sound's Paul St. Hillaire. They have produced sound installations at the Centre Pompidou in Paris and lectured at the Merz Akademie in Stuttgart.

Modeselektor is a favourite group of Thom Yorke (frontman of Radiohead), who has recommended their albums in interviews and included the song "Silikon" (from their 2005 LP Hello Mom! and featuring vocalist Sasha Perera) in a publicly available iTunes playlist. Moderat (the collaboration between Modeselektor and Apparat) has also supported Radiohead on the band's concerts in Poznań, Poland and Prague, Czech Republic, in August 2009.

The follow-up to Hello Mom! was Happy Birthday!, which was released in 2007 with Paul St. Hilaire, TTC, Puppetmastaz,  Thom Yorke and Maxïmo Park as guest vocalists. Other collaborators included Otto von Schirach, Siriusmo, and Apparat. In an interview that same year, the group said regarding their sound: "Happy metal, hard rap, country-ambient, Russian crunk. We don’t like it if people tag us as being a certain style or school or scene or whatever. We don’t really care about all that."

In March 2009, they released an album with Apparat under the name Moderat. They have collaborated previously on an EP named  which was released as a limited 12" on BPitch Control in 2002.

Modeselektor also appeared as the main characters in Amy Grill's 2009 electronic music documentary, Speaking in Code.

Modeselektor are said to be good friends with Siriusmo, and regularly remix and promote his material.

In September 2011 Modeselektor released their third LP, Monkeytown, in which various artists including Thom Yorke collaborated on. 

In August 2013, Modeselektor released their second album in collaboration with Apparat under the name Moderat, entitled II. 

In 2013, Modeselektor's label Monkeytown Records and Telekom Electronic Beats produced the documentary "We Are Modeselektor".

In March 2016, Modeselektor released their third album in collaboration with Apparat under the name Moderat, entitled III. 

In April 2021, Modeselektor released their fourth LP, Extended. 

In February 2022, a book on Modeselektor's album Happy Birthday! was published by Sean Nye for the 33 1/3 Europe series.

In May 2022, Modeselektor released their fourth album in collaboration with Apparat under the name Moderat, entitled More D4ta.

Monkeytown Records
Monkeytown Records is a Berlin-based electronic music record label, owned by Sebastian Szary and Gernot Bronsert of Modeselektor. The label has released music by Moderat, Modeselektor,  WK7, Mouse on Mars, Otto von Schirach, Siriusmo, and Funkstörung, among others.

Discography

Studio albums 
 Hello Mom! (BPitch Control, 2005)
 Happy Birthday! (BPitch Control, 2007)
 Monkeytown (Monkeytown Records, 2011)
 Who Else (Monkeytown Records, 2019)
 Extended (Monkeytown Records, 2021)
 Mean Friend (Monkeytown Records, 2021)

Compilations 
 Modeselektion Vol. 01 (2010)
 Modeselektion Vol. 02 (2012)
 Modeselektion Vol. 03 (2014)
 Modeselektion Vol. 04 (2018)

DJ mixes 
 Boogybytes Vol. 3 - Mixed by Modeselektor (BPitch Control, 2007)
 Body Language Vol. 8 (Get Physical, 2009)

Multimedia 
 Labland (Dalbin, 2005) with Pfadfinderei, DVD
 Mdslktr (BPitch Control, 2005), DVD + CD Box Set

Extended plays 
 Death Medley (BPitch Control, 2002)
 In Loving Memory (BPitch Control, 2002)
 Ganes De Frau Vol. 1 (BPitch Control, 2003)
 Turn Deaf! (BPitch Control, 2004)
 Hello Mom! The Remixes (BPitch Control, 2006)
 Happy Birthday! Remixes #1 (BPitch Control, 2008)
 Happy Birthday! Remixes #2 (BPitch Control, 2008)
 Happy Birthday! Remixes #3 (BPitch Control, 2009)

Singles 
 "Weed wid da Macka" (Shockout, 2006)
 "The Dark Side of the Sun" (BPitch Control, 2007) with Puppetmastaz
 "Evil Twin" featuring Otto von Schirach (Monkeytown Records, 2012)
 "Silikon" featuring Sasha Perrera (FIFA 08 soundtrack)
 "Kalif Storch" (2018)
 "Wealth" featuring Flohio (Monkeytown Records, 2018)
 "I Am Your God" / "Bronko" (Monkeytown Records, 2019)
 "Who" featuring Tommy Cash (Monkeytown Records, 2019)

Remixes 
 Miss Kittin - "Professional Distortion (Modeselektor's Big Muff Mix)"
 Thom Yorke - Skip Divided (Modeselektor Remix)
 Björk - Dull Flame Of Desire (Modeselektor's Rmx for Girls)
 Björk - Dull Flame Of Desire (Modeselektor's Rmx for Boys)
 Boys Noize - Jeffer (Modeselektor Remix)
 Bonaparte - Computer in Love (Modeselektor Remix) 
 Roots Manuva - Witness (Modeselektor's Troublemaker Remix)
 Headhunter - Prototype (Modeselektor Remix) [TEMP046]
 Radiohead - Good Evening Mrs Magpie Rmx
 Trentemøller - Tide (Modeselektor's Last Remix Ever)

Production 
 TTC - Une bande de mecs sympas (3615 TTC, 2007)
 Fettes Brot - Bettina, zieh dir bitte etwas an! (Strom und Drang, 2008)
 Bonaparte - Orangutang (My Horse Likes You, 2010)

With Moderat 
 Auf Kosten der Gesundheit (EP, BPitch Control, 2003)
 Moderat (BPitch Control, 2009)
 II (Monkeytown Records, 2013)
 III (Monkeytown Records, 2016)
 More D4ta (Monkeytown Records. 2022)

References

External links
 
 
 Pfadfinderei Vj Collaborators
 The Fake Interview (French)
 In the Mix Review/Interview
 Modeselektor Portrait on Tracks/arte (French-German TV)
 Book: 33 1/3 Europe Modeselektor's Happy Birthday!, by Sean Nye (London: Bloomsbury Academic, 2022).
 Feature interview
 stuartbuchanan.com interview
 Electronic Beats interview
 Modeselektor RBMA video lecture session

German electronic music groups
BPitch Control artists
Musical groups from Berlin
German musical duos
Electronic music duos
Male musical duos